The Frankenstein Brothers is a 2010 independent romantic comedy that takes place in Longmont, Colorado. The plot is centered on two orphan brothers, recently graduated from college, who inherit the Left Hand Brewing Company.

Plot
The Frankenstein Brothers is a coming of age romantic comedy centered on the lives of twin brothers Luke and Corey Frankenstein in the months following college graduation. Orphaned at the age of five, the brothers inherited their family brewery—the real-life Left Hand Brewing Company—and were left in the care of their uncle, a well-meaning but less than ideal paternal figure.

Raised on beer, with the assumption they’re all grown up, Luke and Corey decide it’s time to finish their family beer; a beer their parents started but were never able to finish twenty years ago. But when the idealistic Luke meets a girl whose family shows him the home life he's always wanted, he abandons Corey and their family beer in pursuit of this budding relationship.

Corey, however, refuses to go down without a fight, and the ensuing mayhem that follows pits brother against brother and forces the Colorado wild boys to finally grow up and decide what kind of men they really want to be.

Cast
 Cru Ennis as Luke Frankenstein
Bryan Suchey as Young Luke Frankenstein
 Lee Roy Kunz as Corey Frankenstein
 Boris Lee Krutonog as Mr. Volkov
 Brandon Henry as Ryan
 Lee Kunz as Connor Frankenstein
 Nicole Kunz as Annie Martinson
 Ellen Lawson as Grandma
 Todd Leigh as Derek
 Kaiwi Lyman as Kai
 Scott Patterson as George Martinson
 Alexandra Paul as Laurie Martinson
 Keith Pratt as Misha
 T. David Rutherford as Grandpa
 Tiffany Shepis as Jane, Party Girl
 Jayden Jaymes as Destiny
 Taryn Southern as Joy
 Nikki Todd as Emma
 Zelda Williams as Kelly Martinson
 Mike Jones as Grooms-Man
 Alex Skeie as Skeetloaf

Production
The Frankenstein Brothers was conceived in 2008 by brothers Lee Roy and Kane Kunz. Lee Roy studied at the USC School of Cinematic Arts, and Kane at Dartmouth College, the project acquired financing in May 2009. The team drew heavily upon its primary financiers’ powerful Denver network to obtain nearly unprecedented access to local shooting locations and resources at free or vastly discounted rates to achieve extraordinarily high production values.

In spring 2009, Kunz began recruiting young filmmakers from USC and the greater Los Angeles communities, fleshing out remaining crew positions with experienced industry veterans. Principal photography commenced on September 2, 2009, and wrapped on September 25.

References

External links
 
 

2010 films
2010 romantic comedy films
American romantic comedy films
Films shot in Colorado
Films about beer
2010s English-language films
2010s American films